RAF-Avia is a Latvian airline headquartered in Riga and based at Riga International Airport.

History 
The airline was established in 1990 with the purpose of delivering parts and manufacturing materials for the Riga Autobus Factory (RAF). It started operations in 1991. In 1994, RAF-Avia began to move into the commercial charter sector. In 1996, it became a private limited company. It is 100% owned by the RAF-Avia group.

In August 2016, the airline stationed two aircraft at Frankfurt Hahn Airport to operate ad hoc charter flights.

Destinations
RAF-Avia operates cargo services for TNT, DHL and others, as well as transport for the military and the United Nations and passenger charters. In late 2015 RAF-Avia announced that it is considering starting regular passenger flights in 2016.

Fleet

Current fleet
The RAF-Avia fleet consists of the following aircraft (as of January 2022):

Former fleet
The RAF-Avia fleet previously included the following aircraft (as of September 2015):
 1 further Antonov An-26

Incidents and accidents
 On 29 October 2014 an RAF-Avia An-26 was guided to Stansted Airport by RAF fighter jets after losing communication with air traffic controllers over southern England.
 On 7 January 2019, the SAAB 340B YL-RAF on a positioning flight from Riga to Savonlinna (EFSA, FI) skidded off the runway during landing and was stuck in snow. While there were no injuries, there was damage to the aircraft at both propellers, landing lights and tyres.

References

External links 

 

Airlines of Latvia
Airlines established in 1990
Companies based in Riga
Latvian companies established in 1990